Dugan or Duggan is an Irish surname (and a list of people with the name).

Dugan or Duggan may also refer to:

Fiction
 Duggan (TV series), a New Zealand TV series
 Dixie Dugan, syndicated newspaper comic strip
 Dugan Duck, Disney comic book character
 Dum Dum Dugan, fictional character in Marvel Comics
 Mickey Dugan, "The Yellow Kid", lead character in Hogan's Alley comic strip
 Pat Dugan, fictional superhero in DC comics
 President Dugan, the supreme leader of Allied forces in the video game Red Alert 2

Places
In the United States
 Duggan, Missouri, an unincorporated community

In Iran
 Dugan, Iran, a village in Iran
 Dugan-e Olya, a village in Iran
 Dugan-e Sofla, a village in Iran

Elsewhere
 Duggan, Edmonton, Alberta, Canada
 Duggan, a village in San Antonio de Areco, Argentina
 Dugan (crater), a lunar crater

Other
 Dugan, a Buddhist temple building, see Buddhism in Buryatia